is an anime series based on  light novel series by Hitoshi Yoshioka, taking the title from its first volume. It was produced by some of Japan's larger studios, including Big West, Tatsunoko Productions, King Records and VAP.

Tylor consists of a 26-episodes TV series directed by Kōichi Mashimo, and a sequel OVA series of 10 episodes directed by Mashimo and Naoyuki Yoshinaga. The TV show premiered in Japan on TV Tokyo between January 25, 1993 and July 19, 1993, and was broadcast across Latin America by the television network, Magic Kids. Both series were broadcast across the United States by AZN Television. Tylor is distributed across North America by The Right Stuf International.

Enterbrain published a 3-volume sequel manga miniseries in 2001 and 2002. The light novels and manga haven't been translated.

A short anime series, titled  and produced by Seven, aired from July 11 to September 26, 2017.

Plot
In a distant, highly technological future, Tylor, the title character, is a mysterious young man without a real purpose in life, a state of mind that is very hard to determine, and a knack for accidentally getting out of near-death situations with a childishly cavalier attitude. He sometimes does not even seem to realize when he is in danger, which is actually an asset to him on many occasions.

Tylor stumbles his way into the United Planets Space Force and soon gains command of a destroyer after resolving a hostage dispute and saving a retired admiral. Despite being given a decrepit and underpowered ship (the Soyokaze), thanks to brilliant strokes of luck, Tylor manages to destroy a patrol group. This is quickly followed by a sneak attack on another patrol group, performed while Tylor was playing the role of a consummate, professional soldier. The admiralty, attempting to kill Tylor, present him with a medal modified with a device to trick the Raalgon fleet into believing the Soyokaze is an entire fleet. Tylor loses the medal in UPSF HQ, and the Raalgons destroy the admiralty's super-weapon instead.

The Soyokaze is then sent to a demotion sector, despite the fervent hopes of its crew. There, Tylor and Yamamoto encounter the ghost of the former captain, who vanishes due to depression after seeing Tylor's behavior. The Admiral of the fleet, who actually drove the prior Captain to suicide, rescinds Tylor's demotion after seeing Tylor with the former captain's pipe, thinking he is now aware of the admiral's crime. Tylor is then captured by the Raalgon fleet, who plan to execute him to boost morale. After escaping his cell, Tylor encounters the Empress of the Raalgon, Azalyn, in plain dress, and spends the day entertaining her. She stops his execution, and his jailors implant microchip in his brain to control him.

Meanwhile, the crew of the Soyokaze has been imprisoned by the brass. They manage to escape captivity and invade the Melva, the main Raalgon ship, to get Tylor back. During the fight, Tylor saves Azalyn from a bomb that her treacherous Prime Minister Wang had detonated to gain power for himself. Tylor is badly injured, and Azalyn tells the Raalgon that she is going with Tylor back to the Soyokaze in order to make sure he is all right. After the doctor saves Tylor, Azalyn returns to her people.

Tylor then rendezvouses with the main fleet, where he is branded a traitor for letting Azalyn return. He is sentenced to death by a firing squad. However, Tylor convinces the brass that he can defeat the Raalgon, and they reluctantly allow him to take complete command. After coming to a stand-off with Dom, Tylor manages to spill no blood and stop the fighting for the time being. After the death of Admiral Hanner, whom Tylor had adored and talked with, Tylor becomes sullen and announces he will leave the military. Lieutenant Yamamoto is given command of the brand new ship, the Aso. In the final episode, the former crew of the Soyokaze, who are supposed to be on the Aso, join Tylor on the Soyokaze as they fly out into space.

The two major powers in the story are the UPSF (United Planets Space Force) and the Raalgon Empire (the extraterrestrials), who resemble humans with pointy ears and unusual haircolor).

One of the largest points of dispute in the story is the competence of Tylor. Several characters say of Tylor, "I can't decide if he's an idiot or a genius." Whether he is a genius or an idiot is up to viewers.

Production
According to The Anime Encyclopedia by Jonathan Clements and Helen McCarthy: "The character [Tylor] is a cartoon version of Hitoshi Taira, the lazy protagonist of the 1962 live-action movie Japan's Irresponsible Age who was played by comedian Hitoshi Ueki. This popular satire on Japan's salaryman culture featured a feckless individual who always managed to come out on top, advancing up promotional ladders when accidents befall his superiors or lucking into important business information simply by malingering and goofing off. The series and its theatrical spin-offs were revived in 1990, suspiciously close to the time when Hummingbirds-creator Hitoshi Yoshioka would have begun work on this anime version."

Characters

 is a mysterious, irresponsible man. Tylor, age 20, joined the United Planets Space Force for what he hoped would be an easy life. Originally assigned to the Pension department, he unwittingly foiled a terrorist plot to kidnap and kill a retired UPSF admiral when he tried to deliver a late check by hand. For saving the war hero's life, Tylor was promoted to Major and placed in command of the destroyer Soyokaze (the UPSF dumping ground for trouble makers and the unwanted). Tylor has, as his superiors have put it, 'The Devil's own luck' and usually can get out of any situation relatively unscathed, avoiding multiple assassination attempts and defeating enemy groups of vastly superior numbers. He is very laid back and does not really care for the rules, using his authority as captain to change whatever regulations seem too uptight for him. He is also easily led by his crew, who are able to convince him to allow them to wear comfortable clothes on watch, hold a swimsuit competition, and let the surgeon drink while on duty. The UPSF and the Raalgon Empire are constantly debating whether Tylor possesses the most brilliant military mind or whether he is just a lucky moron.

 is a very strait-laced, by-the-book officer. Yuriko joined the UPSF to give her life structure and attempts to obey the rules in almost every situation. However, she, unlike Yamamoto, has no problem telling Tylor that he has done something wrong and will even resort to slapping him when he gets too far out of line. Yuriko also tries to downplay her gender, making herself a soldier first, and then a woman. This is a sore subject for her when someone comments about Tylor's obvious attraction to her looks, pointing out that she has never used her appearance to get ahead; an equally sore point for her is her budding attraction to him. Yuriko is one of the most rational and level-headed officers on the Soyokaze. While she is senior to Yamamoto, her speciality as an intelligence officer places her outside the chain of command.

 is another very strait-laced, by-the-books military man. Yamamoto is the first officer on the Soyokaze and tried mightily to interject an air of professionalism to the outfit. Constantly enraged by Tylor's lack of discipline and his loose command of the troops, Yamamoto spends much of his free time in the medic's office taking tranquilizers and making use of the neuro-cleanser. Yamamoto sees Tylor for what he is, a bumbling fool, but is torn between the unwritten soldier's code of supporting and obeying your superior officer, and telling the UPSF brass what is REALLY going on. He is always on the lookout for a chance to get some form of command, hoping to get a ship of his own one day.

 is the 16-year-old empress of the Holy Raalgon Empire. Azalyn is a child, forced into the unenviable situation of having to assume power of the empire once her parents are murdered. Prompted by her advisors, she gives the command to attack the UPSF (under the assumption that they were behind the assassination plot). Having not had a chance to be a child, Azalyn must now be strong for the entire empire, and it's a task that she is afraid of taking, but even more afraid of failing in.

 is the commander of one of the Raalgon fleets. He speaks candidly with the Empress, in stark contrast to the bowing and scraping and lying of the rest of her court. Dom gains Azalyn's trust and becomes one of her more valued advisors. Dom is also very interested in Tylor, feeling that Tylor would be not only a worthy adversary, but also a challenge for anyone to decipher and defeat. It is Dom who assigned Harumi to spy on the Soyokaze's enigmatic captain, but even with the constant data coming in from his valued spy, Dom is still unsure whether Tylor really knows what he is doing or if he is just a fool.

Light novels
The Irresponsible Captain Tylor is adapted from the series of light novels The Most Irresponsible Man in Space by Hitoshi Yoshioka and published under Fujimi Shobo's Fujimi Fantasia Bunko label. When the anime adaptation began, the series consisted of three trilogies and several side stories which are partly adapted by anime. Additional novel series followed, with The True Irresponsible Captain Tylor being a reprint of the original series with three volumes of new content. No light novels in the series have been translated.

The Most Irresponsible Man in Space
Series 1
1. The Irresponsible Captain Tylor (Musekinin Kanchou Tylor)
2. The Most Irresponsible Man in the Meiji Period (Meiji Ichidai Musekinin Otoko)
3. Wang Strikes Back! (Wang no Gyakushuu)

Series 2
4. The Irresponsible Admiral Tylor (Musekinin Gensui Tylor)
5. Azalyn, Age 16 (Azalyn, 16-sai)
6. Tylor's Big Turnabout (Tylor no Daigyakuten)

Series 3
7. The Irresponsible President Tylor (Musekinin Daitouryou Tylor)
8. Wind Speed: 40 Light Years! (Fuusoku Yon-Juu Kounen)
9. The Eternally Irresponsible Man (Eiennare Musekinin Otoko)

The Most Irresponsible Man in Space Side Stories
1. The Galactic Age of Irresponsiblity (Ginga Musekinin Jidai)
2. The Samurai of Space (O-zora no Samurai)
3. The Scarlet Lion (Akaki Shishi)
4. Rebellion on Ice Planet Horoshiri! (Gentou Wakusei Horoshiri no Hanran)
5. Hatori-kun Time (Hatori-kun Taimu)
6. My name is Yamamoto (Waga mei wa Yamamoto)

The Irresponsible Kids
1. The Black Sun Belle (Ankoku Taiyou Komachi)
2. The Storm of "Why?" (Why? no Arashi)
3. Burning KISARA (Moete KISARA)
4. Time Guide (Jisen Annai-jin)
5. Galactic Marriage Story (Ginga Yometori Monogatari)

The Irresponsible Quartet
1. Your Name is Machiko (Kiminonaha Machiko)
2. Angel / Disqualified (Tenshi / Shikkaku)
3. Cult Annihilation (Jakyō Senmetsu)
4. Decisive Battle! Rose Nebula (Kessen! Barairo Seiun)
5. Galactic Advocate (Ginga Sansho)

The Irresponsible Three Kingdoms
1. Plot Triangle (Bōryaku Toraianguru)
2. Cold Trigonometric Function (Tsumetai Sankakukansu)
3. Flame Tricolor (Honō no Torikorōru)
4. Miracle Trinity (Kiseki no Torinitī)
5. Three Animals Advance (San-biki Kaishingekio)
6. Three Crows Appear! (Sanbagarasu tōjō!)
7. Three Crowns (Mittsu no ōkan (Kuraun))
8. The Third Challenge! (Shiren no sanbanshōbu!)
9. Third Big Bang (Sādo Bigguban)
10. Shine! Tristar (Kagayake! Toraisutā)

The Irresponsible Apocalypse
1. Financial Lightning (Fainansu Denkōsekka)
2. To Hurt (To~uhāto)
3. Double Prince (Daburu Purinsu)
4. Don't Win (Katte wa Ikenai)
5. Beyond the Grace (Onshūnokanatani)

The True Irresponsible Captain Tylor
1. Enlistment (Nyūtai)
2. Struggle (Funtō)
3. Encounter (Kaigō)
4. Prisoner of War (Ryoshū)
5. Revival (Fukkatsu)
6. Triumph (Gaisen)
7. Sidestory Love and War Part 1 (Gaiden Ravu ando U~ō-jō)
8. Sidestory Love and War Part 2 (Gaiden Ravu ando U~ō-ka)
9. ReMix Lullaby to the Lion and the Eagle (Shishi to Washi e no Rarabai)

The Irresponsible Admiral Tylor
1. Light (Kashoku)
2. Lost (Shittsui)
3. Rebellion (Hangyaku)
4. Return (Kikan)

Anime

The anime adaptation began as a 26-part TV series broadcast on TV Tokyo and ran from January 25 to July 19, 1993. All episodes were directed by Kōichi Mashimo, and were produced by Tatsunoko Production. The OVA was a 10-part series released between October 1, 1994 and August 1, 1996. All episodes were directed between Mashimo and Koji Sawai, and were produced by Studio Deen. The story follows the career of Justy Ueki Tylor, a young man who decided to join the United Planets Space Force believing it will lead to an easy life. He later finds himself in command of his own spaceship, the Soyokaze, where he finds himself at odds with his military enemy, the Raalgon Empire, and his own crew due to his laid-back manner.

The TV series featured an opening and closing performed by Mari Sasaki: "Just Think Of Tomorrow" and "Downtown Dance" respectively. They, along with the rest of the soundtrack for both the TV series and OVA were released by AnimeTrax on June 5, 2001.

The TV series was released in the United States by Right Stuf first on VHS between October 21, 1997 and July 21, 1998, and was later released on DVD on January 30, 2001. The OVA was released on DVD between July 31 and September 25, 2001. The series was released as a digitally remastered thinkpak by Right Stuf's division Nozomi Entertainment, with the TV series released on May 26, 2009 and the OVA on August 28, 2009. The series was released on Blu-ray on October 5, 2021.

A short anime series, titled  and produced by Seven, aired from July 11 to September 26, 2017. It was streamed in English by Crunchyroll.

Soundtrack
The soundtrack to both the TV series and the OVA were both released on CD by ADV Films and Right Stuf on June 5, 2001.

Manga
Set years after the OVAs, the manga Love & War, with a story by Hitoshi Yoshioka and artwork by Kotaro Mori, was published by Enterbrain in three volumes in 2001 and 2002. In it, Tylor is now a vice admiral and captain of the battleship Omi. This time he gets with his fiancée and political officer Lt. Cmdr. Yuriko Star and his staff officer and adjutant Cmdr. Makoto Yamamoto in a time travel adventure back into the past of Raalgon during the reign of Goza XV.
The manga is unfinished, but Yoshioka adapted and finished the story as the first two side-story volumes of The True Irresponsible Captain Tylor reprint series in 2003 and 2004, with Mori again providing illustrations.

Notes and references

External links
The Irresponsible Captain Tylor official English site

J-pop.com review
Animerica review of OVA
Yoshioka Hitoshi in The Encyclopedia of Science Fiction
Novel release dates (in French)

1989 Japanese novels
1993 anime television series debuts
1993 Japanese novels
1994 anime OVAs
2001 Japanese novels
2001 manga
2002 Japanese novels
2009 Japanese novels
2012 Japanese novels
2017 anime television series debuts
Anime and manga based on light novels
Fujimi Fantasia Bunko
Kadokawa Dwango franchises
Light novels
Parody anime and manga
Seven (animation studio)
Space opera anime and manga
Studio Deen
Tatsunoko Production
TV Tokyo original programming